In modular arithmetic, a number  is a primitive root modulo  if every number  coprime to  is congruent to a power of  modulo . So  is a primitive root modulo  if and only if  is a generator of the multiplicative group of integers modulo .

Gauss defined primitive roots in Article 57 of the Disquisitiones Arithmeticae (1801), where he credited Euler with coining the term. In Article 56 he stated that Lambert and Euler knew of them, but he was the first to rigorously demonstrate that primitive roots exist for a prime . In fact, the Disquisitiones contains two proofs: The one in Article 54 is a nonconstructive existence proof, while the proof in Article 55 is constructive.

Elementary example
The number 3 is a primitive root modulo 7 because

Here we see that the period of 3 modulo 7 is 6. The remainders in the period, which are 3, 2, 6, 4, 5, 1, form a rearrangement of all nonzero remainders modulo 7, implying that 3 is indeed a primitive root modulo 7.

Definition
As explained in the article multiplicative group of integers modulo , this multiplicative group is cyclic if and only if  is equal to 2, 4, or 2 where  is a power of an odd prime number.

When  is non-cyclic, such primitive elements mod  do not exist. Instead, each prime component of  has its own sub-primitive roots (see  in the examples below).

Examples

Here is a table of their powers modulo 14:

  x     x, x2, x3, ... (mod 14)
  1 :   1
  3 :   3,  9, 13, 11,  5,  1 
  5 :   5, 11, 13,  9,  3,  1
  9 :   9, 11,  1
 11 :  11,  9,  1
 13 :  13,  1

The order of 1 is 1, the orders of 3 and 5 are 6, the orders of 9 and 11 are 3, and the order of 13 is 2. Thus, 3 and 5 are the primitive roots modulo 14.

  x     x, x2, x3, ... (mod 15)
  1 :   1
  2 :   2,  4,  8, 1 
  4 :   4,  1
  7 :   7,  4, 13, 1
  8 :   8,  4,  2, 1
 11 :  11,  1
 13 :  13,  4,  7, 1
 14 :  14,  1

Since there is no number whose order is 8, there are no primitive roots modulo 15. Indeed, where  is the Carmichael function.

Table of primitive roots

Numbers  that have a primitive root are of the shape

= {1, 2, 3, 4, 5, 6, 7, 9, 10, 11, 13, 14, 17, 18, 19, ...} 
These are the numbers  with  kept also in the sequence  in the OEIS.

The following table lists the primitive roots modulo  up to :

Properties

Gauss proved that for any prime number  (with the sole exception of  the product of its primitive roots is congruent to 1 modulo .

He also proved that for any prime number , the sum of its primitive roots is congruent to ( − 1) modulo , where  is the Möbius function.

For example,
{|
|-
| = 3, || (2) = −1. || The primitive root is 2.
|-
| = 5, || (4) = 0. || The primitive roots are 2 and 3.
|-
| = 7, || (6) = 1. || The primitive roots are 3 and 5.
|-
| = 31, ||(30) = −1. || The primitive roots are 3, 11, 12, 13, 17, 21, 22 and 24.
|}

If  is a primitive root modulo the prime , then .

Artin's conjecture on primitive roots states that a given integer  that is neither a perfect square nor −1 is a primitive root modulo infinitely many primes.

Finding primitive roots

No simple general formula to compute primitive roots modulo  is known. There are however methods to locate a primitive root that are faster than simply trying out all candidates.

Finally, compute

using a fast algorithm for modular exponentiation such as exponentiation by squaring. A number  for which these  results are all different from 1 is a primitive root.

The number of primitive roots modulo , if there are any, is equal to

For prime , this equals , and since  the generators are very common among {2, ..., −1} and thus it is relatively easy to find one.

If  is a primitive root modulo , then  is also a primitive root modulo all powers  unless −1 ≡ 1 (mod 2); in that case,  +  is.

If  is a primitive root modulo , then either  or  +  (whichever one is odd) is a primitive root modulo 2.

Finding primitive roots modulo  is also equivalent to finding the roots of the ( − 1)st cyclotomic polynomial modulo .

Order of magnitude of primitive roots

The least primitive root  modulo  (in the range 1, 2, ...,  is generally small.

Upper bounds
Burgess (1962) proved that for every ε > 0 there is a  such that 

Grosswald (1981) proved that if , then 

Shoup (1990, 1992) proved, assuming the generalized Riemann hypothesis, that

Lower bounds
Fridlander (1949) and Salié (1950) proved that there is a positive constant  such that for infinitely many primes 

It can be proved in an elementary manner that for any positive integer  there are infinitely many primes such that  <  <

Applications 

A primitive root modulo  is often used in pseudorandom number generators and cryptography, including the Diffie–Hellman key exchange scheme. Sound diffusers have been based on number-theoretic concepts such as primitive roots and quadratic residues.

See also

 Dirichlet character
 Full reptend prime
 Gauss's generalization of Wilson's theorem
 Multiplicative order
 Quadratic residue
 Root of unity modulo

Footnotes

References

Sources

 

 

The Disquisitiones Arithmeticae has been translated from Gauss's Ciceronian Latin into English and German. The German edition includes all of his papers on number theory: all the proofs of quadratic reciprocity, the determination of the sign of the Gauss sum, the investigations into biquadratic reciprocity, and unpublished notes.

Further reading
.

External links
 

 

Modular arithmetic